John Angus Laird (16 August 1935 - 13 May 2016) was an Australian rules footballer who played with Geelong in the Victorian Football League (VFL).

Notes

External links 

1935 births
Australian rules footballers from Victoria (Australia)
Geelong Football Club players
2016 deaths